The Kandi Factory is an American reality competition series on Bravo that debuted April 9, 2013. Developed as a spin-off of The Real Housewives of Atlanta, starring Kandi Burruss.

The show chronicles Burruss and her team at The Kandi Factory as she assists 16 aspiring artists trying to jumpstart their dreams of success in the music industry.

The series is the second spin-off of The Real Housewives of Atlanta.

On August 30, 2013, Burruss confirmed that the series would not be returning for another season.

Cast
 Kandi Burruss
 Don Vito
 Victor Jackson
 Kwame Waters

Production
On September 29, 2011, Bravo announced The Kandi Factory as a one-time special without an air date. On February 22, 2012, Bravo announced that the special will be airing March 4 at 10:00/9:00c; after a new episode of The Real Housewives of Atlanta. Due to the substantial number of viewers of the special, Bravo picked up the series for a full season on April 4, 2012. Production for the first season of the series wrapped up on December 17, 2012.

Contestants

Episodes

References

External links

2010s American reality television series
2013 American television series debuts
2013 American television series endings
English-language television shows
Bravo (American TV network) original programming
The Real Housewives spin-offs
Television shows set in Atlanta
American television spin-offs
Reality television spin-offs